Huynh's bent-toed gecko (Cyrtodactylus huynhi)  is a species of lizard in the family Gekkonidae. The species is endemic to Vietnam.

Etymology
The specific name, huynhi, is in honor of Vietnamese biologist Dang Huy Huynh.

Geographic range
C. huynhi is found in southern Vietnam. The type locality is Chua Chan Mountain, Dong Nai Province.

Habitat

Reproduction
C. huynhi is oviparous.

References

Further reading
Goldberg S, Bursey CR, Grismer LL (2019). "Notizen zur Fortpflanzung von Huynhs Bogenfingergecko Cyrtodactylus huynhi (Squamata, Gekkonidae) aus Vietnam ". Sauria 41 (3): 56–57. (in German).
Ngo Van Tri; Bauer, Aaron M. (2008). "Descriptions of two new species of Cyrtodactylus Gray 1827 (Squamata: Gekkonidae) endemic to southern Vietnam". Zootaxa 1715: 27–42. (Cyrtodactylus huynhi, new species).

Cyrtodactylus
Reptiles described in 2008